The 2008 Coke Zero 400 Powered by Coca-Cola was the eighteenth race of the 2008 NASCAR Sprint Cup season, marking the official halfway point of the season.

Summary
This race was held on July 5 of that year at Daytona International Speedway in Daytona Beach, Florida, and was the third race utilizing restrictor plates this season. TNT's  air time began at 6:30 PM US EDT, and MRN with Sirius Satellite Radio carried the radio broadcast beginning at 7:15 PM US EDT.

Pre-Race news
Dario Franchitti is out of a ride and Chip Ganassi Racing's #40 car is out of the series. The Dodge team shut down July 1 due to a lack of permanent sponsorship along with a lack of success in qualifying for races, even with Franchitti injured earlier in the season. Ganassi Racing fired some 70 employees who had been working on the car at the time of closure.
The Dale Earnhardt, Inc. #1 car driven by Truex was a backup car, as NASCAR impounded the primary car due to a rules violation on the roof in a pre-practice inspection. On July 8, Martin Truex Jr. was docked 150 driver points, the team docked 150 owners points, and their crew chief slapped with the now seemingly mandatory $100,000 fine, six-week suspension and probation until December 31.
David Reutimann tied the record for most consecutive Lucky Dog passes due to a pitting strategy that forced him to pit about 6 laps before the other leaders did. As soon as he pitted, a caution came out almost instantly. As a result, Reutimann finished 21st.

Qualifying
Paul Menard won his first pole of his career in Sprint Cup racing, edging his teammate, Mark Martin out for the honor.

OP: qualified via owners points

PC: qualified as past champion

PR: provisional

QR: via qualifying race

* - had to qualify on time

Failed to qualify, withdrew, or driver changes:   Scott Riggs (#66), J. J. Yeley (#96), Dario Franchitti (#40-WD)

Race recap
The biggest news in the event was that Tony Stewart dropped out during a caution in Lap 72 because of flu-like symptoms, and J. J. Yeley took his place in the #20 Toyota. Yeley was on standby after he failed to qualify in the #96 Hall of Fame Racing Toyota.

Also making news was David Reutimann, driver of the Michael Waltrip Racing #44 Toyota, as he tied the record for most consecutive lucky dog free passes in a race between the fourth and eighth of 11 cautions overall, as in each case his car was the first car one lap (or more) down, and as a result, finished 21st.

The tenth caution sent the race went to a green-white-checker finish with four laps remaining.  In the first lap of "Checkers or Wreckers", second place driver Jeff Gordon was bumped by Carl Edwards, and spun onto the infield but the green flag stay aloft.  However, the second "Big One" occurred on the white flag lap involving Michael Waltrip, Travis Kvapil and Yeley amongst others, and when the yellow light was lit, Kyle Busch, who was as far down as 37th due to a steering wheel problem, was declared the winner over Edwards by 0.026 of a second.

Results 

NOTE: Race extended two laps due to green-white-checker finish.

Failed to Qualify: Scott Riggs (#66) and J. J. Yeley (#96).

2009 Race
It was announced in August that next year's Coke Zero 400 would have the superstretch grandstand closed and tickets limited to the 110,000 seats all the way around the current seating configuration from outside Turn Four to Turn One as an economic measure.

Results

Coke Zero 400
Coke Zero 400
NASCAR races at Daytona International Speedway